The Territory of Alabama (sometimes Alabama Territory) was an organized incorporated territory of the United States. The Alabama Territory was carved from the Mississippi Territory on August 15, 1817 and lasted until December 14, 1819, when it was admitted to the Union as the twenty-second state.

History
The Alabama Territory[n] was designated by two interdependent Acts of the Congress of the United States on March 1 and 3, 1817, but it did not become effective until October 10, 1817. The delay was due to a provision in the Congressional Act which stated that the act would only take effect if and when the western part of the Mississippi Territory (1798–1817) were to form a state constitution and government on the road to statehood. A state constitution for Mississippi was adopted on August 15, 1817, elections were held in September, and the first legislative session convened in October, with the western part of the Mississippi Territory existing since 1798 becoming the State of Mississippi on December 10, 1817. 

St. Stephens, located in the central area of the Alabama Territory on the Tombigbee River, was the only territorial capital during the period. William Wyatt Bibb (1781–1820) of Georgia was the only territorial governor, later elected to that position after statehood.

On December 14, 1819, Alabama was admitted to the union as the 22nd U.S. state, with Bibb becoming the first state governor (1819–1820).

Territorial evolution of Alabama

Territories of the Kingdom of Spain and its worldwide Spanish Empire that would later become part of the future territories of Alabama:
La Florida (Spanish Florida), 1565–1763
Florida Occidental (West Florida), 1783–1821
Mobile District

Possession of the Kingdom of Great Britain since 1763, in the Treaty of Paris (1763) ending the French and Indian War (1756–1763), (known as the Seven Years' War in Europe), until 1783, with the Treaty of Paris (1783) that the lands would later be ceded to become part of the newly independent United States after 1776, 

Organized as the old Southwest Territory or Territory of the Southwest [also then occasionally known as the "Territory South of the Ohio River"] (1790–1796), then later
Reorganized and renamed as the Mississippi Territory (1798–1817), then the
Territory of Alabama was carved out of the eastern half in 1817 until 1819:
West Florida, 1763–1783 (briefly possessed by Britain, acquired from Spain.

U.S. states that ceded territorial claims that would later become part of the future State of Alabama:
State of South Carolina, 1787
State of Georgia, 1802 (sold the disputed Yazoo lands to the U.S. Federal government)

U.S. territory with land that would later become part of the Territory of Alabama:
Mississippi Territory, 1798–1817

U.S. state created from the Alabama Territory, 1817–1819:
State of Alabama, December 14, 1819 to present

See also

Historic regions of the United States
History of Alabama
Territorial evolution of the United States

Notes
  [n] - Name "Territory of Alabama" was often used in the time period, rather than "Alabama Territory".

References

 Williams, Lewis et al.; "An 1820 Claim to Congress: Alabama Territory : 1817." Op. cit.: Gales & Seaton; American State Papers; Washington: 1834; retrieved 21 February 2010.

External links 
Journal of the Convention of the Alabama territory, begun July 5, 1819 (a 1909 reprint)

 
Mississippi Territory
Pre-statehood history of Alabama
1817 establishments in Mississippi Territory
1819 disestablishments in the United States